The 2007 Zasyadko mine disaster was a mining accident that happened on November 18, 2007 at the Zasyadko coal mine in the eastern Ukrainian city of Donetsk.

By November 30, 101 miners were reported dead:
the worst accident in Ukraine's history. At the time of the explosion, 457 miners were in the complex.

Causes and investigation

The Zasyadko Mine is considered one of the most dangerous coal mines in the world, An independent mining expert recently claimed that the company management, linked to a powerful local clan, interferes with hazard-measuring equipment on a permanent basis, in order to present underground situation as being within the safety standards, and so to prevent production from closure by the government inspectors. President Viktor Yushchenko blamed the cabinet for failing to “implement safe mining practices” in the coal industry. A criminal investigation is also underway.

Government reaction
Families of the deceased miners will receive compensations totaling ₴100,000, (approx. $ USD) which constitutes part of the ₴15 million that the Government of Ukraine had set aside for renovation of the mine to prevent future accidents from happening.

On November 19, 2007, President Viktor Yushchenko signed a decree that calls for investigation into Zasyadko mine disaster as well as prevention of such disasters in the future. The President also signed a decree making November 20 a Day of National Mourning.

Mining accidents trend

Within the past decade, the frequency of mining accidents has increased in the Donbas coal region. The Zasyadko mine accident is the deadliest ever accident in Ukraine, surpassing the Barakova Mine accident in 2000, which killed at least 80 workers.

The Zasyadko Mine, Ukraine's largest and most equipped mine, employs 10,000 people and produces up to 10,000 tons of coal per day. Prior to this, four previous major mining accidents at the mine had killed a total of 148 workers combined.

Recurring accidents

Twelve days later, on December 1, 2007, at 5:55 local time another methane explosion happened in the same mine section injuring 52 miners.
After this, at 21:20 local time on December 2, another explosion occurred, killing at least 5 workers and injuring 30 more.

See also
 2008 Ukraine coal mine collapse, a gas explosion in June 2008

References

Explosions in 2007
2007 mining disasters
2007 in Ukraine
Gas explosions
Coal mining disasters in Ukraine
Explosions in Ukraine
History of Donetsk
November 2007 events in Europe
2007 disasters in Ukraine